Cribbin is a surname, and may refer to:

 J. J. Cribbin, Irish priest and Gaelic footballer who played for Ballyhaunis and Mayo
 Larry Cribbin, Irish Gaelic footballer who played for Clane and Kildare
 Tom Cribbin, Irish Gaelic footballer who played for Clane and managed Clane, Laois, Offaly and Westmeath

See also
 Bernard Cribbins, English actor

Surnames